Bashir Saad (born March 3, 1991, in Zahle) is a Lebanese professional basketball player currently playing for Anibal Zahle Club in the Lebanese Basketball League. He also played for Al Mouttahed club in Tripoli. He competed with the junior national team at the FIBA Under-19 World Championship 2007. He is (6 ft 6 in) tall and weighs 216 lb.

Bashir completed the Basketball without Borders Asia basketball camp on July 8, 2007 and August 2, 2009 official certificate of participation signed by Kim Bohuny National basketball association and Zoran Radovic Fiba word And also Certificate of excellence the unity through sports (USPORT Training program October 29 to November 11, 2005 signed by Donald W.Mitchell director Indiana center for cultural exchange Purdue University, Hal Clubertson associate director Joan B.Kroc Institute University of Notre Dame, Lynn Jamieson chairperson Dept. of Recreation and Park Administration Indiana University

http://basketball.asia-basket.com/player/Bachir_Saad/Lebanon/Anibal_Zahle/75594

http://www.interbasket.net/forums/showthread.php?10447-2009-FIBA-NBA-BWB-Asia-Camp-Jul-30-Aug-2-Beijing-China

http://www.sportingpulse.com/assoc_page.cgi?c=11-3223-48857-126557-13800489&sID=31915&&news_task=DETAIL&articleID=10943375

Lebanese men's basketball players